Crucible is the second studio album by the heavy metal band Halford released in 2002. A remixed and remastered edition was released in 2010.  In contrast with the retrospective approach of the previous Halford album, Resurrection, Crucible was an intentional effort to depart from the traditional metal themes. The album has been described as "harder, darker, and more moody than Resurrection".

Track listing

2010 Remixed and Remastered edition

Personnel

Halford
Rob Halford – vocals
Metal Mike Chlasciak – guitar
Patrick Lachman – guitar
Ray Riendeau – bass
Bobby Jarzombek – drums
Additional performer
Roy Z – guitar

Production
Produced by Roy Z, except "In the Morning", produced by Ritchie Podolor and Roy Z
Executive producer/A&R – John Baxter
Mixed by Bill Cooper, Roy Z, and Joe Floyd
Mastered by George Marino
2010 Edition
Mixed by Tue Madsen
Mastered by Tom Baker
Art design by Mark Sasso and t42design
Booklet layout/additional art by Attila Juhasz
Photography by John Eder

References

2002 albums
Halford (band) albums
Albums produced by Roy Z